Antônio Luiz Júnior (born November 7, 1971), better known by his stage name Rappin' Hood, is a Brazilian rapper, record producer, activist and former television presenter. He is famous for being a pioneer of the "samba rap" in the mid- to late 1990s.

Biography

Antônio Luiz Júnior was born on November 7, 1971 in the bairro of Heliópolis, São Paulo. Diagnosed with vitiligo early in his childhood, he began writing his first songs when he was circa 14 years old, also taking trumpet and cornet lessons. His career as a rapper officially began in 1989, after he won a rap battle, subsequently taking the stage name "Rappin' Hood" as a pun on legendary English outlaw Robin Hood.

In 1992 he formed the group Posse Mente Zulu, or PMZ, recording with them one of the greatest hits of the early Brazilian hip hop scene, "Sou Negrão"; he left PMZ in 2001 to start a solo career with the release of Sujeito Homem through independent label Trama, which was lauded by critics owing to its inventive mix of hip hop and samba. A sequel, Sujeito Homem 2, came out in 2005 and counted with guest appearances of famous musicians such as Caetano Veloso, Jair Rodrigues, Arlindo Cruz, Zélia Duncan, Gilberto Gil and Dudu Nobre. A third installment came out in 2015. Also in 2001 he was a guest musician on Sabotage's debut (and ultimately only release), Rap É Compromisso!.

In 2004 he recorded the songs "É Tudo no Meu Nome" and "Se Essa Rua" (the latter featuring Luciana Mello) for the soundtrack of the film Meu Tio Matou um Cara.

In 2005 he was a guest musician on band Charlie Brown Jr.'s album Imunidade Musical, on the track "Cada Cabeça Falante Tem sua Tromba de Elefante". The same year, the music video for his song "Us Guerreiro" was nominated for the MTV Video Music Brazil award in the "Best Rap Video" category.

From 2008 to 2009 he hosted the hip hop culture-oriented variety show Manos e Minas on TV Cultura.

In 2016 he made his first performance at the sixth edition of Rock in Rio.

In 2019 he partnered with Japanese singer MIC on her single "Try", released on April 4. The same year he announced he would be returning to college, to finish a Management course he began two decades prior, also stating he began work on a new album entitled Os Dez Mandamentos, described as a concept album inspired by the Ten Commandments.

In June 2022 he was diagnosed with COVID-19.

References

External links
 

1971 births
Living people
Brazilian rappers
Brazilian activists
Brazilian television presenters
Afro-Brazilian musicians
Brazilian hip hop musicians
Brazilian record producers
20th-century Brazilian male singers
20th-century Brazilian singers
21st-century Brazilian male singers
21st-century Brazilian singers
Singers from São Paulo
People with vitiligo
Brazilian male singer-songwriters